The Moskalenki constituency (No.140) is a Russian legislative constituency in Omsk Oblast. The constituency was created in 2016, it took parts of Omsk from Central and Omsk constituencies and southwestern Omsk Oblast from Lyubinsky constituency.

Members elected

Election results

2016

|-
! colspan=2 style="background-color:#E9E9E9;text-align:left;vertical-align:top;" |Candidate
! style="background-color:#E9E9E9;text-align:left;vertical-align:top;" |Party
! style="background-color:#E9E9E9;text-align:right;" |Votes
! style="background-color:#E9E9E9;text-align:right;" |%
|-
|style="background-color:"|
|align=left|Oleg Smolin
|align=left|Communist Party
|
|44.76%
|-
|style="background-color:"|
|align=left|Yevgeny Dubovsky
|align=left|A Just Russia
|
|14.75%
|-
|style="background-color:"|
|align=left|Kirill Atamanichenko
|align=left|Liberal Democratic Party
|
|14.13%
|-
|style="background:"| 
|align=left|Vladimir Zhukov
|align=left|Communists of Russia
|
|10.43%
|-
|style="background-color:"|
|align=left|Tatyana Ogarkova
|align=left|Party of Growth
|
|4.60%
|-
|style="background:"| 
|align=left|Sergey Astashenko
|align=left|People's Freedom Party
|
|2.37%
|-
|style="background:"| 
|align=left|Oleg Kurnyavko
|align=left|Civic Platform
|
|2.35%
|-
| colspan="5" style="background-color:#E9E9E9;"|
|- style="font-weight:bold"
| colspan="3" style="text-align:left;" | Total
| 
| 100%
|-
| colspan="5" style="background-color:#E9E9E9;"|
|- style="font-weight:bold"
| colspan="4" |Source:
|
|}

2021

|-
! colspan=2 style="background-color:#E9E9E9;text-align:left;vertical-align:top;" |Candidate
! style="background-color:#E9E9E9;text-align:left;vertical-align:top;" |Party
! style="background-color:#E9E9E9;text-align:right;" |Votes
! style="background-color:#E9E9E9;text-align:right;" |%
|-
|style="background-color:"|
|align=left|Oleg Smolin (incumbent)
|align=left|Communist Party
|
|42.94%
|-
|style="background-color: " |
|align=left|Kirill Mandrygin
|align=left|United Russia
|
|19.34%
|-
|style="background:"| 
|align=left|Svetlana Andrushko
|align=left|Communists of Russia
|
|10.30%
|-
|style="background-color: " |
|align=left|Nikolay Biryukov
|align=left|New People
|
|9.22%
|-
|style="background-color:"|
|align=left|Kirill Atamanichenko
|align=left|Liberal Democratic Party
|
|5.71%
|-
|style="background-color: "|
|align=left|Iosif Drobotenko
|align=left|Party of Pensioners
|
|5.18%
|-
|style="background: "| 
|align=left|Dmitry Perevalsky
|align=left|Yabloko
|
|1.81%
|-
| colspan="5" style="background-color:#E9E9E9;"|
|- style="font-weight:bold"
| colspan="3" style="text-align:left;" | Total
| 
| 100%
|-
| colspan="5" style="background-color:#E9E9E9;"|
|- style="font-weight:bold"
| colspan="4" |Source:
|
|}

References

Russian legislative constituencies
Politics of Omsk Oblast